Malaya Chiryadka is a rural locality (a village) in Kichmegnskoye Rural Settlement, Kichmengsko-Gorodetsky District, Vologda Oblast, Russia. The population was 35 as of 2002.

Geography 
Malaya Chiryadka is located 27 km southwest of Kichmengsky Gorodok (the district's administrative centre) by road. Bolshaya Chiryadka is the nearest rural locality.

References 

Rural localities in Kichmengsko-Gorodetsky District